Neoancistrocrania is a monotypic genus of brachiopods belonging to the family Craniidae. The only species is Neoancistrocrania norfolki.

The species is found in near Eastern Australia.

References

Craniata
Brachiopod genera
Monotypic brachiopod genera